Kirkton of Durris is a hamlet in the Kincardine and Mearns area of Aberdeenshire, Scotland. Historic structures in the vicinity include Maryculter House, Durris House and Muchalls Castle.

A short history of the parish of Durris was written in 2019: The Parish of Durris: some historical sketches. 239pp.  .  The author was Robin Jackson.

The book contains the following chapters:  1.  Early history; 2.  Religious history of Durris; 3.  Statistical accounts; 4.  Life in a rural parish: Part one; 5.  Life in a rural parish: Part two; 6. A Durris kirk mystery; 7.  Durris House; 8.  Lairds and proprietors of Durris; 9. The Milne family of Durris; 10.  Conclusion.

See also
 Durris Forest

Footnotes

Villages in Aberdeenshire